is a Japanese football player. She played for Tokyo Verdy Beleza in the WE League. She also played for the Japan national team between 2006 and 2016.

Club career
Iwashimizu was born in Takizawa on 14 October 1986. In 2003, she was promoted to Nippon TV Beleza after developing in their youth team. She played 260 matches in the L.League until 2017. She was elected to the league's Best XI for 12 years in a row (2006-2017).

National team career
On 18 February 2006, when Iwashimizu was 19 years old, she debuted for Japan national team against Russia. She has played in the 2007, 2011 and 2015 World Cups, winning the 2011 World Cup and winning a silver medal at the 2012 Summer Olympics. In the final minute of extra time in the 2011 World Cup Final, she was sent off after receiving a red card for slide tackling Alex Morgan. Japan would go on to win the match in the penalty shootout that followed.

Iwashimizu was instrumental in Japan's victory at the 2014 Asian Cup, scoring the winning goal in both the semifinal against China and the final against Australia. She played 122 games and scored 11 goals for Japan until 2016.

Club statistics

National team statistics

Honors and awards

Team
 Japan women's national football team
 FIFA Women's World Cup
 Champion: 2011
 East Asian Football Championship
 Champion: 2010
 East Asian Football Championship
 Champions: 2008, 2010

 Nippon TV Beleza
 L.League
 Champions (11): 2001, 2002, 2005, 2006, 2007, 2008, 2010, 2015, 2016, 2017, 2018
 Empress's Cup :
 Champions: 2004, 2005, 2007, 2008, 2009, 2014, 2017, 2018
 Nadeshiko League Cup :
 Champions: 2007, 2010, 2012, 2016, 2018

Individual
 L.League
 Best Eleven (13): 2006, 2007, 2008, 2009, 2010, 2011, 2012, 2013, 2014, 2015, 2016, 2017, 2018

References

External links

Japan Football Association

1986 births
Living people
Japan Women's College of Physical Education alumni
Association football people from Iwate Prefecture
Japanese women's footballers
Japan women's international footballers
Nadeshiko League players
Nippon TV Tokyo Verdy Beleza players
FIFA Women's World Cup-winning players
2007 FIFA Women's World Cup players
2011 FIFA Women's World Cup players
2015 FIFA Women's World Cup players
Olympic footballers of Japan
Olympic silver medalists for Japan
Olympic medalists in football
Medalists at the 2012 Summer Olympics
Footballers at the 2008 Summer Olympics
Footballers at the 2012 Summer Olympics
Asian Games medalists in football
Asian Games gold medalists for Japan
Asian Games silver medalists for Japan
Medalists at the 2006 Asian Games
Medalists at the 2010 Asian Games
Medalists at the 2014 Asian Games
Footballers at the 2006 Asian Games
Footballers at the 2010 Asian Games
Footballers at the 2014 Asian Games
FIFA Century Club
Women's association football defenders
21st-century Japanese women